Morigaon district is an administrative district in the state of Assam in India. The district headquarters is located at Morigaon. The ancient place of occult Mayong is located in this district as well as Pobitora Wildlife Sanctuary.

History
The history of Morigaon is obscure. One famous traditional ruler of the region was Arimatta whose history is shrouded in mystery. After Arimattas's death, Jongal Balahu (A Great Tiwa King), his son ruled over the region. Jongal Balahu was ultimately killed by the Kacharis with a bamboo spear near Kajalimukh.

The legend further goes on to say that Jongal Balahu to escape his pursuers, submerged himself in Kollong river and emerge at Raha to quench his thirst and again dived here to emerge at Jagi. From this incident were derived the names of present-day Raha and Jagi.

The writing of Bhim Singh throws some light on the history of present Morigaon town and its adjoining areas. This region was ruled independently by six rulers. During this time two princes from Darrang, Supradhvaj and Makardhvaj, fled from their homeland due to internal clash, by crossing the mighty Brahmaputra and they settled at Bahakajari. Later on, Supradhvaj married the daughter of Mangal Singh, the King of Baghara. Supradhvaj was then made the seventh king of the region, having an independent kingdom of his own.

During the days of Lachit Borphukan, another two princes from Darrang, Ram Singh and Bhim Singh crossed the Brahmaputra in search of plain lands. After Bhim Singh settled down, meanwhile, Ram Singh left for his home. Bhim Singh was not liked by the local people, hence, he left Brahmaputra and settled down near Mori Beel. This place came to known as Morigaon.

Morigaon became a fully-fledged district on 29 September 1989, when it was split from Nagaon district.

Geography
The district is bounded by the mighty Brahmaputra on the North, Karbi Anglong district on the South, Nagaon District on the East and Kamrup District on the West. The greater part of the district is an alluvial plain, criss-crossed with numerous rivers and water ways and dotted with many beels and marshes. The mighty Brahmaputra flows along with the northern boundary of the district.

Killing, Kolong and Kopili rivers flow through the southern part of the district. The Killing meets the Kopili at the Matiparbat where from Kopili moves westward. The Kolong joins Kopili at the Jagi Dui Khuti Mukh and from here they jointly fall into the Brahmaputra. The general appearance of the district is extremely picturesque. On a clear day in the winter the view to the north is bounded by the blue ranges of the outer Himalayas, behind which snowy peaks glisten brightly in the sun, while to the west and the south of the district lie range upon range of lower hills, whose sides are covered with luxuriant vegetation of the tropical forest.

Economy
In 2006, the Indian government named Morigaon one of the country's 250 most backward districts (out of a total of 640). It is one of the eleven districts in Assam currently receiving funds from the Backward Regions Grant Fund Programme (BRGF).

Administration

Divisions
There are three Assam Legislative Assembly constituencies in this district: Jagiroad, Morigaon, and Laharighat. Jagiroad is designated for Scheduled Castes. All three are in the Nowgong Lok Sabha constituency.

Villages
 
 
Natuagaon

Demographics

Population
According to the 2011 census Morigaon district has a population of 957,853, roughly equal to the nation of Fiji or the US state of Montana. This gives it a ranking of 455th in India (out of a total of 640). Its population growth rate over the decade 2001-2011 was  23.39%. Morigaon has a sex ratio of 974 females for every 1000 males, and a literacy rate of 69.37%. Males and females constitute 485,328 and 472,525 respectively. Scheduled Castes and Scheduled Tribes make up 12.30% and 14.29% of the population respectively.

In the previous census of India 2001, Morigaon District recorded increase of 21.35 percent to its population compared to 1991.

With regards to Sex Ratio in Morigaon, it stood at 974 per 1000 male compared to 2001 census figure of 946. The average national sex ratio in India is 940 as per latest reports of Census 2011 Directorate.

In census enumeration, data regarding child under 0-6 age were also collected for all districts including Morigaon. There were total 159,088 children under age of 0-6 against 148,765 of 2001 census. Of total 159,088 male and female were 81,567 and 77,521 respectively. Child Sex Ratio as per census 2011 was 950 compared to 966 of census 2001. In 2011, Children under 0-6 formed 16.61 percent of Morigaon District compared to 19.16 percent of 2001. There was net change of -2.55 percent in this compared to previous census of India.

Morigaon district population constituted 3.07 percent of total Assam population. In 2001 census, this figure for Morigaon District was at 3.07 percent of Assam population.

Religion

Islam is the religion of the majority community at 52.56% (503,257) according the 2011 Census, followed by Hinduism at (451,882) 47.2%. Way back in 1971, Hindus were slight majority in Morigaon district with forming 59.4% of the population, while Muslims were 40.4% at that time.

Languages

According to the 2011 census, 73.02% of the population speaks Assamese, followed by 22.18% Bengali, 1.41% Hindi and 1.21% Bodo speakers. 2.18% of the population speak other languages like Tiwa, Nepali, etc.

Literacy
Average literacy rate of Morigaon in 2011 were 69.37 compared to 58.53 of 2001. If things are looked out at gender wise, male and female literacy were 73.66 and 64.99 respectively. For 2001 census, same figures stood at 65.15 and 51.51 in Morigaon District. Total literate in Morigaon District were 554,143 of which male and female were 297,422 and 256,721 respectively. In 2001, Morigaon District had 5,312,396 in its total region.

Flora and fauna

Forests
There are three Reserved Forest constituted under Assam Forest Regulation Act, 1891. These are Sunaikuchi, Khulahat, and Bura Mayong. There is also one wildlife Sanctuary, named Pobitora Wildlife Sanctuary, located in Mayong which is famous for the Indian one horned Rhinoceros.

References

External links

 District Administration website

 
Districts of Assam
Minority Concentrated Districts in India
1989 establishments in Assam